Events in the year 1979 in Bulgaria.

Incumbents 

 General Secretaries of the Bulgarian Communist Party: Todor Zhivkov
 Chairmen of the Council of Ministers: Stanko Todorov

Events 

 16 March – A Balkan Bulgarian Airlines Tupolev Tu-134 airliner crashes near the village of Gabare (130 km northeast of Sofia) on an international flight from Sofia, Bulgaria, to Warsaw Airport, Poland, killing all 73 on board.

References 

 
1970s in Bulgaria
Years of the 20th century in Bulgaria
Bulgaria
Bulgaria